Koshi or Kōshi may refer to:

Places
Koshi River, a river in Nepal
Koshi Pradesh, a province in Nepal named after Koshi river.
Koshi Rural Municipality, a rural municipality in Nepal.
Koshi Province, a historic province of Japan
Koshi District, Niigata, a former district in Niigata Prefecture, Japan
Kōshi, Kumamoto, a city in Kumamoto Prefecture, Japan
Kosi Zone, a former administrative division in Nepal
Kosi division, an administrative division in Bihar, India
Kosi, Cyprus, an abandoned village in Larnaca District
Koshi, musical instrument, manufactured in France

People with the name
, Japanese water polo player
, Japanese volleyball player

Fictional characters
, a character in Sumomomo Momomo
, a character in "Haikyū!!"

Other uses
Kōshi or Kabura-ya, Japanese arrows. See signal arrow

See also 
Kashi (disambiguation)
Kosi (disambiguation)

Japanese masculine given names